Super Da is a 2004 Indian Tamil-language comedy drama film directed by Azhagu Raja Sundaram. The film stars Ramki, Kunal and newcomer Anusha, with Livingston, Sindhuri, Telangana Shakuntala, Paravai Muniyamma, Senthil, Vaiyapuri, Manorama and Ambika playing supporting roles. The film, produced by Anusha's mother B. Sampoornam, had musical score by Deva and was released on 25 June 2004.

Plot

Kathirvel comes to the city to live with his friend Subramani. While Reshma is a soft-spoken college student, her mother Gangamma is a heartless lady rowdy. Rahul, a college student, falls in love with Reshma at the first sight. Reshma also loves him but to save Rahul's life, she tries to avoid him. Finally, Reshma accepts his love. Gangamma, knowing their love affair, hurts heavily Rahul in front of Kathirvel and Subramani and they reached Rahul to the nearby hospital. Reshma insults Kathirvel for being passive during the attack and Kathirvel tells his tragic past to Reshma. In the past, Kathirvel was in love with Reshma's sister Meenakshi. They So Gangamma tried to kill Kathirvel but Meenakshi intervened and was accidentally by her mother. Before her death, Kathirvel promised Meenakshi to not kill her mother. Kathirvel is now determined to unite the lovers. What transpires later forms the crux of the story.

Cast

Ramki as Kathirvel
Kunal as Rahul
Anusha as Reshma
Livingston as Subramani
Sindhuri as Meenakshi
Telangana Shakuntala as Gangamma
Paravai Muniyamma as Muniyamma
Senthil
Vaiyapuri
Manorama as Rasathi's father
Ambika
Anuradha
Shakeela as Meera Krishnan
Sharmili as Sarasu
Abhinayashree
Ponnambalam
Balu Anand
Anu Mohan
Uday Prakash
K. Babu as a doctor
V. S. Balamurugan as a postman
C. J. Muthukumar as a marriage broker
Azhagu Raja Sundaram as a snake charmer 
Aravind Akash in a guest appearance

Production
Some scenes were shot in Chennai, at the Besant Nagar beach and on Anna Salai.

Soundtrack

The film score and the soundtrack were composed by Deva. The soundtrack, released in 21 May 2004, features 5 tracks with lyrics written by Kalidasan, Piraisoodan, Kalai Kumar, Tholkapiyan and Victordas.

References

2004 films
2000s Tamil-language films
Indian action films
Films scored by Deva (composer)
2004 action films